Mario Salas may refer to:

Mario Marcel Salas (b. 1949), American civil rights leader, author and politician
Mario Salas (footballer) (b. 1967), Chilean football manager and former player
Mario Salas (athlete), Cuban javelin thrower